Andrea Cecon (born July 18, 1970 in Gemona del Friuli) was an Italian Nordic combined skier who competed from 1992 to 2001. He also competed as a ski jumper at the 1994 Winter Olympics in Lillehammer, finishing eighth in the team large hill event.

Career
As a Nordic combined athlete, Cecon's best finish at the FIS Nordic World Ski Championships was 20th in the 15 km individual event at Ramsau in 1999. His best World Cup finish was eighth in a 15 km individual event in Norway in 1994. Cecon earned two total career victories at various distances in 1996 and 1998.

Results
 1988: 3rd, Italian championships of Nordic combined skiing
 1990: 1st, Italian championships of Nordic combined skiing
 1991: 2nd, Italian championships of Nordic combined skiing
 1992: 1st, Italian championships of Nordic combined skiing
 1993: 2nd, Italian championships of Nordic combined skiing
 1994: 1st, Italian championships of Nordic combined skiing
 1995: 2nd, Italian championships of Nordic combined skiing
 1997: 3rd, Italian championships of Nordic combined skiing
 1998: 1st, Italian championships of Nordic combined skiing
 1999: 2nd, Italian championships of Nordic combined skiing
 2000: 2nd, Italian championships of Nordic combined skiing

References

External links

1970 births
Nordic combined skiers at the 1994 Winter Olympics
Italian male Nordic combined skiers
Italian male ski jumpers
Living people
People from Gemona del Friuli
Olympic ski jumpers of Italy
Ski jumpers at the 1994 Winter Olympics
Sportspeople from Friuli-Venezia Giulia